Rhythm + Flow is a 2019 music reality television series on Netflix which premiered on October 9, 2019. It is Netflix's first original music competition program.

In the series, hip-hop artists Cardi B, Chance the Rapper, and T.I. critique and judge unsigned rappers, who are competing to win a  prize. In several episodes, the judges are joined by guest judges, who give the competitors additional feedback.

Development
Rhythm + Flow is the first music competition show developed for Netflix. Because Netflix is not subject to the same censorship regulations as normal broadcast television, competitors were not asked to censor profanity in their lyrics.

Rather than a recording contract, a typical prize in other music competitions, the winner is awarded a  cash prize.

Judges
 Cardi B, an American rapper, songwriter, actress and television personality
 Chance the Rapper, an American rapper, singer, songwriter, actor and activist
 T.I., an American rapper, record producer, songwriter, actor, record executive and entrepreneur

Competitors

Release
The first four episodes of Rhythm + Flow were released on October 9, 2019, on Netflix. Three more episodes were released on October 16. The final three were released on October 23. In most Netflix series, all episodes of a season are released at once. Rhythm + Flow uses a more staggered release schedule to approximate the format of a traditional music competition show and build anticipation before the winner is announced.

Episodes

Accolades

Rhythm + Flow France
Netflix released a French version of the show in 2022, named "Nouvelle École" (which translates to New School) in France and was branded "Rhythm + Flow France" in Europe, which consisted of eight episodes. Judges for this spin-off were Marseille based SCH, Paris based Niska and Bruxelles based Shay.

Notes

References

External links
 
 
 

2019 American television series debuts
2019 American television series endings
English-language Netflix original programming
French-language Netflix original programming
2010s American music television series